The FCK Rolling Devils are a wheelchair basketball club located in Kaiserslautern with German soccer club 1. FC Kaiserslautern acting as name sponsor till 2020. Their first team played in the Rollstuhlbasketball-Bundesliga from 2014 to 2016.

History 
The wheelchair basketball team of 1. FC Kaiserslautern was founded in September 2009 as a part of the club's basketball department. The Rolling Devils entered league play of the German Wheelchair Sports Federation in the season 2010/11 on the level of the third-class Regional League (Central Conference). The team won the Regional Cup and advanced to the quarter finals of the German National Cup. The Devils finished the season with the championship and promotion to the 2nd German Wheelchair Basketball Federal League (Southern Conference).

In the next two seasons the Devils dropped from German Wheelchair Sports Cup in the group stage, but finished as runners-up in the 2nd Federal League. In 2013 the team participated for the German Wheelchair Sports Federation in International Wheelchair Basketball Federation Euroleague 3 and finished in third place.

In March 2013, FCK Rolling Devils re-established as a separate wheelchair basketball department. In the season 2013/14 the Rolling Devils again advanced to the quarter finals of the German National Cup and in the third attempt won the championship in the 2nd German Federal League thereby gaining promotion to the 1st German Federal League. In the season 2014/15, the Devils made it again to the quarter finals of the German National Cup and finished their first season in the 1st German Federal League on rank 7 and thereby as the best promoted team of the last four seasons.

In July 2015, the spin-off of FCK Rolling Devils as independent club with 1.FC Kaiserslautern acting as name sponsor took place. The wheelchair basketball department at 1.FC Kaiserslautern was suspended at the annual general meeting of the club in December 2015. In the season 2015/16, the Devils again made it to the quarter finals of the German National Cup and finished the season on rank 7.

In August 2016, the club withdrew its first team from the 1st German Federal League for financial and sports reasons and continued league play with their second team in the third-class regional league. In the next two seasons, the Rolling Devils finished on rank 3. In the season 2018/19, the Devils won the championship and right for promotion to the 2nd German Wheelchair Basketball Federal League (Southern Conference), but decided to stay in the regional league for financial reasons. The season 2019/20 ended ahead of schedule due to the COVID-19 pandemic and the Rolling Devils finished with several games less played than the other teams on rank 4. The COVID-19 pandemic also caused such a massive decrease of sponsorship money, that the Devils could not take part with a team on the season 2020/21. Since then, the club has not resumed training and match operations.

Honors

National
 Regional Cup (Central Conference) Winner 2010
 Regional League (Central Conference) Champion 2011 (Regionalliga Mitte, 3rd division)
 2nd Federal League (Southern Conference) Champion 2014
 Regional League (Central Conference) Champion 2019 (Regionalliga Mitte, 3rd division)

2nd team
 First League (Central Conference) Champion 2014 (Oberliga Mitte, 4th division)
 Regional Cup (Central Conference) Winner 2014

Players

Roster

Leaves

Season by season 

(green highlighting: championship and promotion, blue highlighting: championship, red highlighting: relegation), *: FCK Rolling Devils 2, **: season end ahead of schedule

Management

Team managers

Head coaches

Notable players and coaches

Notable players

Current players

Former players 
 Serdar Antac (2013 - 2015): German champion 2003, Willi Brinkmann Cup winner 2001, Turkish champion 2006, 2007, 2008 and 2009, IWBF Champions Cup winner 2008 and 2009, Kitakyushu Champions Cup winner 2008 and 2009, European champion (Group B) with Turkey 2006
 Janic Binda (2014 - 2016): Swiss champion 2009, 2010, 2011, 2012, 2013 and 2014, Swiss cup winner 2009, 2010, 2011, 2012, 2013 and 2014, Swiss international
 Paul James Capasso (2014 - 2016): US champion 1993, 1995 and 2004, André Vergauwen Cup winner 2014, US international
 Nico Dreimüller (2010 - 2013): German champion 2015 and 2017, German cup winner 2015, 2017 and 2018, Champions cup winner 2015, German international
 Pieter Dries (2013 - 2015): European champion (Group B) with Belgium 2008, Belgian cup winner 2016
 Sascha Gergele (2009 - 2019): German champion 2003, Willi Brinkmann Cup winner 2001, German international
 Philipp Häfeli (2014 - 2015): Swiss champion 2010, 2011 and 2012, Swiss cup winner 2010, 2011 and 2012, German champion 2017, German cup winner 2017 and 2018, Swiss international
 Matthias Heimbach (2013 - 2016): German cup winner 2008, German champion 2009, IWBF Champions cup finalist 2010, European championship finalist with Germany 2011, German international
 Kai Möller (2015 - 2016): Italian champion 2013, Italian cup winner 2013, German cup winner 2018, German international
 Sebastian Spitznagel (2010 - 2014): German champion 2003, German international
 Klaus Weber (2009 - 2013): German champion 1994 and 2003, German cup winner 1993, Willi Brinkmann Cup winner 2001, German international
 Jacob Michael Williams (2015 - 2016): US champion 2015, German champion 2018, 2019 and 2020, German cup winner 2019, Champions Cup winner 2018, US international

Notable coaches 
 Christa Weber (2009 - 2013): German champion 1994, 1997 and 2003, German cup winner 1993, Willi Brinkmann Cup winner 2001, Coach of German women's national team, Coach of Germany women's under-19 national team
 Clifford Fisher (2014 - 2015): Italian champion 2004, 2009 and 2010, Italian cup winner 2004, 2007 and 2010, Italian supercup winner 2008, Turkish champion 2011, André Vergauwen Cup winner 2004, Willy Brinkmann Cup winner 2008, European champion with Italy 2003 and 2005, Coach of Italian national team, Coach of Italian national under-22 team, Coach of Belgium national team
 Paul James Capasso (2015 - 2016): André Vergauwen Cup winner 2014

Miscellaneous

Naming
The naming in wheel chair basketball at 1.FC Kaiserslautern is influenced by the club's image from soccer: The team name Rolling Devils traces back to the nickname Red Devils of 1.FC Kaiserslautern's soccer team, the wheel chair basketball team like the club's professional soccer team also has a devil at mascot, and like the Fritz-Walter-Stadion in soccer, the home playing site of FCK Rolling Devils is commonly known as hell (of Kaiserslautern).

Fans

From 2012 to 2016, FCK Rolling Devils welcomed on average more than 250 spectators at their home games and were thereby one of the most visited wheel chair basketball teams in Germany. Devils fan culture has strong ties to 1.FC Kaiserslautern's club culture in soccer: the unofficial fan club Rolling Devils Supporters overlaps with soccer fan clubs and the fan culture features many elements from soccer fandom.

Media
FCK Rolling Devils host a homepage, one of the most popular Facebook sites in German wheel chair basketball and from 2014 to 2016 also their own YouTube channel.

Awards
For their social commitment, FCK Rolling Devils in 2011 received the Stern des Sports (Star of Sports) in bronze from the German Olympic Sports Confederation and in 2013 the Brückenpreis (Bridge award) of the federal state Rhineland-Palatinate.

References

External links 
 Official website
 Facebook site

 
Wheelchair basketball teams
Basketball teams in Germany